Lost at Seventeen is the second studio album by American rock band Emily's Army, released on June 11, 2013, through Rise Records and Adeline Records. The album was produced by drummer Joey Armstrong's father, Billie Joe Armstrong.  It is the band's last studio under their former name "Emily's Army" after changing their name to "Swimmers" in late 2014, and later "Swmrs" in late 2015 It is also the last record to feature lead guitarist Travis Neumann and last to feature Max Becker on bass before switching to lead guitar. It is also their last studio album to be released through Adeline Records and Rise Records.

Background
After touring on Warped Tours 2011 and 2012, the band returned to the studio to record their second album in late 2012. The sound of the album changes little from their debut album Don't Be A Dick, but does have a lighter sound. The album had more of a pop punk to pop rock sound, instead of a punk rock sound like the first album. Drummer Joey Armstrong's father, Billie Joe Armstrong, had an impact on the album's sound.

Track listing

Personnel
Credits for Lost at Seventeen adapted from liner notes.
Emily's Army
 Cole Becker – Lead vocals, rhythm guitar 
 Max Becker – Lead vocals, bass
 Joey Armstrong – Drums, percussion, backing vocals
 Travis Neumann  – Lead guitar, backing vocals

Additional personnel
 Billie Joe Armstrong - Production
 Chris Dugan - Engineering, Mixing 
 Lee Bothwick - Engineering
 Sebastian Mueller - Saxophone

References

2013 albums
SWMRS albums
Rise Records albums
Adeline Records albums